Jennifer Kay Bellamy Chandler (born June 13, 1959) is a retired American diver who won the gold medal in the women's 3-metre springboard event at the 1976 Summer Olympics. She also won a gold medal at the 1975 Pan American Games and a bronze medal at the 1978 World Aquatics Championships. She is also a seven-time national diving champion.

Chandler started diving when she was nine. When she was 12 she went to the junior Olympics. In 1975 she won the AAU national indoor 1-meter springboard event. In 1976 she won the national indoor 3-meter springboard championship. She retired when she was 21 due to back injuries.

Chandler was inducted into the Alabama Sports Hall of Fame (ASHOF) in 1985. She was also inducted into the International Swimming Hall of Fame in 1987. Chandler has done work as an expert commentator for several national television networks. She became the Educational Outreach Director for ASHOF in 2003. She now works for the Lakeshore Foundation, a world-class rehabilitation and athletic training facility located in Birmingham, Alabama, as their Development and Special Events Coordinator.

She earned a BFA in drawing and painting from The University of Arizona.  She is married to John W. Stevenson, the publisher and editor of The Randolph Leader in Roanoke, Alabama.   Chandler is also a painter with work on display through the Art of the Olympians organization.

See also
 List of members of the International Swimming Hall of Fame

References

External links
 

1959 births
Living people
Divers at the 1976 Summer Olympics
Olympic gold medalists for the United States in diving
People from Valley, Alabama
American female divers
Medalists at the 1976 Summer Olympics
World Aquatics Championships medalists in diving
Pan American Games gold medalists for the United States
Pan American Games medalists in diving
Divers at the 1975 Pan American Games
The Westminster Schools alumni
Medalists at the 1975 Pan American Games
21st-century American women